Paweł Leszkowicz (born 17 December 1970) is a Polish art historian and art curator. He works as a lecturer and researcher at the Department of History of Art, Adam Mickiewicz University in Poznań, and lectures at the University of Fine Arts in Poznań. He is a member of International Association of Art Critics.

Biography
Leszkowicz studied art history, gender studies and journalism at Adam Mickiewicz University in Poznań, Courtauld Institute of Art in London; and he was a Fulbright scholar at New School University in New York. In 2000, he defended his doctoral dissertation on Helen Chadwick at the Adam Mickiewicz University in Poznań.

Leszkowicz is an LGBT rights activist. Together with his partner Tomasz Kitliński he took part in Poland's lesbian and gay visibility campaigns Let Them See Us and Equal in Europe. He is a member of Poland's Green Party.

Exhibitions
 GK Collection, the first exhibition of the private art collection of Grażyna Kulczyk (the main private collector of contemporary art in Poland)
 Love and Democracy, Poznań and Gdańsk, 2006
 Ars Homo Erotica at the National Museum in Warsaw, 2010
 Civil Partnerships: Feminist & Queer Art & Activism at the University of Brighton, 2012 (with Lara Perry and Tomasz Kitliński)

Books
 Helen Chadwick. Ikonografia podmiotowości [Helen Chadwick: The Iconography of Subjectivity] (2001)
 Miłość i demokracja. Rozważania o kwestii homoseksualnej w Polsce [Love and Democracy: Reflections on the Queer Question in Poland] (2005, with Tomasz Kitliński)
 Art pride. Polska sztuka gejowska [Art Pride: Gay Art from Poland] (2010)
 Nagi mężczyzna. Akt męski w sztuce polskiej po 1945 roku [The Naked Man: The Male Nude in post-1945 Polish Art] (2012)

Bibliography
 Jon Davis, "Towards an Intimate Democracy in Europe: Pawel Leszkowicz's Queer Curating", Journal of Curatorial Studies; February 2013, Vol. 2 Issue 1, p. 54-69.

References

1970 births
Academic staff of Adam Mickiewicz University in Poznań
European art curators
Polish LGBT rights activists
Polish art historians
Living people
The Greens (Poland) politicians
Adam Mickiewicz University in Poznań alumni
Alumni of the Courtauld Institute of Art
Academic staff of the University of Fine Arts in Poznań
Polish curators
Fulbright alumni